Tristaniopsis exiliflora, the kanuka box, is a species of plant in the family Myrtaceae. It is found beside streams in Queensland, Australia, ranging from near the coast to 1,000 metres above sea level.

References

Flora of Queensland
exiliflora